Phenyl(trichloromethyl)mercury is an organomercury compound with the formula C6H5HgCCl3.  It is a white solid that is soluble in organic solvents.  The compound is used as a source of dichlorocarbene, e.g. in cyclopropanation reactions, illustrated with tetrachloroethylene as a substrate, the product being hexachlorocyclopropane:
C6H5HgCCl3  →  C6H5HgCl  +  CCl2
CCl2  +  Cl2C=CCl2  →   C3Cl6

The compound is prepared by treating phenylmercuric chloride with sources of dichlorocarbene. These include the base/haloform reaction and thermolysis of sodium trichloroacetate:
NaO2CCCl3  +  C6H5HgCl  →  C6H5HgCCl3  +  NaCl  +  CO2

Related compounds
Closely related compounds include phenyl(bromodichloromethyl)mercury (CAS registry number 3294-58-4) and phenyl(tribromomethyl)mercury (CAS registry number 3294-60-8).  According to X-ray crystallography, the former has nearly linear coordination geometry at mercury, with a C-Hg-C angle of 179° and Hg-C distances of 2.047 Å.

Also known is bis(trichloromethyl)mercury, Hg(CCl3)2.

References

Organomercury compounds
Phenyl compounds
Trichloromethyl compounds